The 2019 Rugby Europe Women's Sevens Conference was the third divisions of Rugby Europe's 2019 sevens season. It was held in Zagreb, Croatia on 15–16 June 2019, with the winner advancing to the European qualifying tournament, as well as the 2020 Women's Sevens Trophy alongside the runner-up.

Pool stage

All times in Central European Summer Time (UTC+02:00)

Pool A

Pool B

Pool C

Knockout stage

9th Place

5th Place

Cup

Placements

External links
 Tournament page

References

2019
2019 rugby sevens competitions
2019 in Croatian women's sport
rugby sevens
Conference